Denis Barbe (born June 25, 1978) is a Seychellois footballer. He is a midfielder on the Seychelles national football team.

See also
Seychelles Football Federation

References

External links

1978 births
Living people
Seychellois footballers
Seychelles international footballers
Place of birth missing (living people)
Association football midfielders